Buchholz (Nordheide) is a railway station located in Buchholz in der Nordheide, Germany. The station is located on the Wanne-Eickel–Hamburg railway, Heath Railway and Wittenberge–Buchholz railway. The train services are operated by Metronom and Erixx.

Train services
The station is served by the following services:

Regional services  Bremen - Rotenburg - Tostedt - Buchholz - Hamburg
Local services  Buchholz - Soltau - Hanover
Local services  Bremen - Rotenburg - Tostedt - Buchholz - Hamburg

References

Railway stations in Lower Saxony